Ono Island may refer to:

 Ono Island (Fiji), an island in the Kadavu Group, Fiji
 Ono Island (Alabama), a barrier island in Baldwin County, Alabama, United States